is a railway station in the city of Numazu, Shizuoka Prefecture, Japan, operated by the Central Japan Railway Company (JR Central).

Lines

Station layout
The station has one side platform serving a single bi-directional track. The station building has automated ticket machines, TOICA automated turnstiles and is staffed.

History
Ōoka Station began as an unnamed rail siding constructed during the Pacific War to serve the numerous munitions plants located Ōoka district of Numazu. After the end of World War II, it was officially opened as a civilian train station on January 15, 1946. Regularly scheduled freight operations were suspended from 1971. Along with privatization and division of JNR, JR Central started operating the station on April 1, 1987.

Station numbering was introduced to the Gotemba Line in March 2018; Shimo-Togari Station was assigned station number CB17.

Passenger statistics
In fiscal 2017, the station was used by an average of 1277 passengers daily (boarding passengers only).

Surrounding area
Toshiba Numazu plant
Numazu Kita High School
Numazu Higashi High School

See also
 List of Railway Stations in Japan

References

External links

 Official website 

Railway stations in Japan opened in 1946
Railway stations in Shizuoka Prefecture
Gotemba Line
Stations of Central Japan Railway Company
Numazu, Shizuoka